The A-League Men is the premier professional men's association football league in Australia. It is currently consists of twelve teams; ten based in Australia and one based in New Zealand. The league has been contested since 2005, when it was founded as the A-League. In its most recent form, the league includes a 26-round regular season and an end-of-season finals series playoff tournament involving the highest-placed teams, culminating in the Grand Final match. The winning team of the Grand Final is crowned A-League champion, while the regular season winners are dubbed ‘premiers’.

List of seasons
The following is a list of all A-League seasons. It contains the number of teams, the number of regular season matches played, the premier, the champions, teams who have gained Asian qualification and the top scorer(s) in regular season matches—winner of the Golden Boot.

Grand Finals
The A-League Men Grand Final is the final match of the A-League Men season, the culmination of the finals series, determining the champions of the tournament.

*Attendance limited due to impact of COVID-19 pandemic

See also
List of A-League honours
A-League all-time records

Notes

References